
Year 14 BC was either a common year starting on Thursday or Friday or a leap year starting on Wednesday, Thursday or Friday (link will display the full calendar) of the Julian calendar (the sources differ, see leap year error for further information) and a common year starting on Tuesday of the Proleptic Julian calendar. At the time, it was known as the Year of the Consulship of Crassus and Lentulus (or, less frequently, year 740 Ab urbe condita). The denomination 14 BC for this year has been used since the early medieval period, when the Anno Domini calendar era became the prevalent method in Europe for naming years.

Events 
 By place 
 Roman Empire 
 The Roman general Nero Claudius Drusus fortifies Augusta Vangionum, the modern city of Worms, Germany.
 Caesar Augustus makes Beeroth (modern Beirut) a colonia, named Colonia Julia Augusta Felix Berytus.
 Winter – The Roman Legio X Fretensis is stationed in Syria, and the legionaries are settled at the ancient city of Beirut.

Births 
 Agrippina the Elder, daughter of Marcus Vipsanius Agrippa and Julia the Elder (d. AD 33)
 Claudia Pulchra, daughter of Paullus Aemilius Lepidus and Claudia Marcella Minor (d. AD 26)
 Drusus Julius Caesar, son of the Emperor Tiberius and step-grandson of the Emperor Augustus (d. AD 23)
 Ma Yuan, Chinese general of the Han dynasty (d. AD 49)

Deaths 
 Lucius Varius Rufus, Roman Latin poet and writer 
 Sulpicia, wife of Lucius Cornelius Lentulus

References